The Australia Stakes, registered as the Stanley Wootton Stakes, is a Moonee Valley Racing Club Group 2 Thoroughbred horse race raced under weight for age conditions, for three year olds and older, over a distance of 1200 metres at Moonee Valley Racecourse in Melbourne, Australia in late January. Total prize money for the race is A$350,000.

History
Originally the race was scheduled in March, but in 2002 the MVRC moved the race to late January. The renaming of the race to the current name coincides with the Australia Day public holiday.

Grade
1989 - Listed Race
1990–1993 - Group 3
1994 onwards Group 2

Name
1989–1997  - Stanley Wootton Stakes
1998–2009  - Norman Carlyon Stakes
2010 onwards   - Australia Stakes

Venue
In 1995 the race was held at Flemington Racecourse.

Record
Hareeba ran the race record time of 1:08.4 down the straight track at Flemington Racecourse.
The race record at Moonee Valley was recorded by Dark Beau with a time of 1:09.1.

Winners

 2022 - Marabi
 2021 - Streets of Avalon
2020 - Scales Of Justice
2019 - Whispering Brook
2018 - Thronum
2017 - Malaguerra
2016 - Holler
 2015 - Mourinho
 2014 - Richie's Vibe
 2013 - Sea Lord
 2012 - Black Caviar
 2011 - Whitefriars
 2010 - Black Caviar
 2009 - Lucky Secret
 2008 - Let Go Thommo
 2007 - El Segundo
 2006 - California Dane
 2005 - Super Elegant
 2004 - Vocabulary
 2003 - Yell
 2002 - Royal Code
 2001 - Piavonic
 2000 - Slavonic
 1999 - Sports
 1998 - Flavour
 1997 - Clang
 1996 - All Our Mob
 1995 - Hareeba
 1994 - Kenvain
 1993 - Schillaci
 1992 - Dapper’s Hope
 1991 - Dark Beau
 1990 - Redelva
 1989 - Jet Fighter

See also
 List of Australian Group races
Group races

References

Horse races in Australia
Open sprint category horse races
Recurring sporting events established in 1989